Brachydoxa are a genus of moths, belonging to the family  Tineidae.

Species
Brachydoxa syntrocha Meyrick, 1917
Brachydoxa vagula (Meyrick, 1919)

References

Dryadaulinae